The British Baltic Fleet and also known as the Baltic Squadron was a series of temporary or semi permanent fleets of the Royal Navy. They were assembled at Spithead a naval anchorage in the English Channel for various naval operations in the Baltic Sea from 1658 to 1856 commanded by the Commander-in-Chief, Baltic Fleet.

Overview

The Baltic Fleet comprised a series of temporary fleets assembled for various naval campaigns of the Royal Navy from 1658 to 1854 under the command of a Commander-in-Chief, Baltic Fleet. The fleet operated from a number of bases including Spithead in Hampshire but also the Nore. During the Crimean War of 1853–1856, the final Baltic Fleet was the largest assembled since the Napoleonic Wars, and in terms of armament the most powerful naval force the Royal Navy possessed in the mid-19th century. Pictured right is the fleet sailing from Spithead on 11 March 1854.

History
In November 1658 Vice-Admiral William Goodsonn was appointed to command the English Baltic Fleet of twenty ships – he was transporting General at sea Sir George Ayscue, who was being loaned to Sweden to assist in their naval operations against Denmark and the Dutch during the Dano-Swedish War (1658–1660).

In 1715 Sir John Norris was sent with a fleet to the Baltic Sea to support a coalition of naval forces from Russia, Denmark and Hanover taking part in the Great Northern War of 1700–1721 against Sweden. Tsar Peter of Russia took personal command of the coalition fleet and appointed Norris as his deputy in 1716: together they protected British and other allied merchant vessels from attack by warships of the Swedish Empire.

In 1717 the Baltic fleet formed again – this time under the command of Sir George Byng. It set out for the Baltic following information received by the Admiralty that Charles XII of Sweden was meditating a new movement in support of the exiled Stuarts. The Danish admiral Peter Raben in his flagship Printz Christian received orders from the Danish admiralty in June 1717 to work fully with the British admiral.

Following the death of Charles XII of Sweden on 30 November 1718 O.S., Admiral Sir John Norris returned to the region as Commander-in-Chief of the Baltic Fleet to protect British merchant shipping from attack by Russian raiders.

In 1726 Sir Charles Wager was appointed to take command of a large battle fleet sent to the Baltic to protect Sweden and Denmark from the threat of a recently mobilized Russian fleet. Stopping first at Copenhagen, he met with the court and completed arrangements for co-operation with the Danish navy. Wager took his twenty ships of the line to Reval (in present-day Estonia). He had orders to engage and destroy the Russian fleet if it came out. To reassure Sweden, the combined fleet stayed at Reval all summer. The British fleet arrived back in Britain on 1 November 1726. but actually lifted the blockade on 1 October

In 1801 Sir Hyde Parker was appointed to command the Baltic Fleet destined to break up the northern armed neutrality (Denmark–Norway, Prussia, Sweden, and Russia), with Vice-Admiral Horatio Nelson as his second-in-command. Copenhagen, the first objective of the expedition, fell in the Battle of Copenhagen on 2 April 1801.

In 1808 Rear-Admiral Sir James Saumarez was given command of the British Baltic fleet with his flag in HMS Victory. His mission involved protecting the British trade interests that were of vital importance for Royal Navy supplies (naval stores and timber), in addition to blockading enemy ports such as those under French control in northern Germany. The Russian fleet was also kept under blockade until Alexander I reopened Russian ports. In 1812 Napoleon invaded Russia – the Baltic fleet succeeded in obstructing French operations.

In February 1854 Rear-Admiral Sir Charles Napier was appointed to command the Baltic Fleet. It sailed on 11 March for an expedition to the Baltic to attack the fortresses at Kronstadt and Sveaborg. Napier reported back to the Admiralty they despite his attempts the fortresses were impregnable – he was relieved of his command in December 1854.

On 20 March 1854, Vice-Admiral James Dundas taking command of the fleet stationed at Spithead, Hampshire, it proceeded to the Baltic Sea where it was employed on blockading duties to prevent Russia from receiving supplies at its Baltic ports until 13 August 1854.

On 27 June 1855 the fleet was stationed at Spithead under the command of Rear-Admiral Richard Dundas it was a very large force consisted of some 93 naval units in total as reported in the Melbourne Argus newspaper at the time.

In command
Post holders included:

Composition of the fleet 1855
As of 27 June 1855:

Footnotes

Notes

Bibliography
 Callo, Joseph F.; Wilson, Alastair (2004). Who's Who in Naval History: From 1550 to the present. Cambridge, London: Routledge. .
 Campbell, John; Kent, John (1785). Biographia Nautica: Or, Memoirs of Those Illustrious Seamen, to Whose Intrepidity and Conduct the English are Indebted, for the Victories of Their Fleets, the Increase of Their Dominions, the Extension of Their Commerce, and Their Preeminence on the Ocean. Interspersed with the Most Material Circumstances of Naval History, from the Norman Invasion to the Year 1779. Embellished with Copper-plates. Dublin, Ireland: J. Williams.
 Campbell, John (1814). Lives of the British Admirals: Containing Also a New and Accurate Naval History, from the Earliest Periods. London, England: C. J. Barrinton. 
 Grehan, John; Mace, Martin (2014). "VIII British Battles of the Crimean Wars 1854 to 1855". British Battles of the Crimean Wars 1854–1856: Despatches from the Front. Barnsley, England: Pen and Sword. .
 Harrison, Simon (2010–2018). "Three Decks – Warships in the Age of Sail: Fleet lists 1553 to 1821". threedecks.org. S. Harrison. 
 Hore, Captain Peter (2015). "James Saumarez". Nelson's Band of Brothers. Barnsley, England: Seaforth Publishing. .
 Grainger, John D. (2014). The British Navy in the Baltic. Woodbridge, England: Boydell & Brewer Ltd. .
 Heathcoate, Tony (2002). British admirals of the fleet 1734–1995 : a biographical dictionary. Barnsley: Pen and Sword. .
 Heathcoate, Tony (2005). Nelson's Trafalgar captains and their battles. Barnsley, England: Pen & Sword Maritime. .
 Laughton, John Knox. "Byng George". Dictionary of National Biography, 1885–1900. London, England: Smith, Elder and Co. 
 Laughton, John Knox. (1885–1900). "Parker Hyde (1739–1807)". Dictionary of National Biography, London, England: Smith, Elder & Co.
 Lavery, Brian (2015). Nelson's Victory: 250 Years of War and Peace. Barnsley, England: Seaforth Publishing. .
 Richards, Donald (2006). Conflict in the Crimea: British Redcoats on Russian Soil. Barnsley, England: Pen and Sword. .
 Williams, Chris (2006). A Companion to Nineteenth-Century Britain. Hoboken, New Jersey, United States: John Wiley & Sons. .

Danish source
T. A. Topsøe-Jensen og Emil Marquard (1935) “Officerer i den dansk-norske Søetat 1660–1814 og den danske Søetat 1814–1932" (Danish Naval Officers). Two volumes (downloadable here ).

Fleets of the Royal Navy
Military history of the Baltic Sea
Military units and formations established in 1658
Military units and formations disestablished in 1854